New Mann at Newport is a 1967 album by jazz flutist Herbie Mann.  The full title on the cover is New Mann at Newport: Herbie Mann Returns to the Newport Jazz Festival & Plays She's a Carioca/All Blues/Project S/Scratch/Summertime. All but one track were recorded at the Newport Jazz Festival.

Track listing

Side one
"Project S" (Jimmy Heath) (9:07)
"Scratch" (Wayne Henderson) (10:09)

Side two
"She's a Carioca" (Antônio Carlos Jobim, Ray Gilbert) (8:38)
"All Blues" (Miles Davis) (7:32)
"Summertime" (DuBose Heyward, George Gershwin) (6:20)

Personnel
Herbie Mann - flute
Jimmy Owens - trumpet, flugelhorn
Joseph Orange, Jack Hitchcock - trombones
Reggie Workman - bass
Carlos "Patato" Valdes -  percussion
Bruno Carr- drums
Technical
Bill Hanley, Phil Iehle - recording engineer
Marvin Israel - album design
Joe Alper - cover photography 
Leonard Feather - liner notes

Charting
The album peaked at 14 on the Billboard Jazz Album chart.

References

New Mann at Newport, Herbie Mann. Atlantic Records SD1471 (liner notes)

External links
New Mann at Newport at Allmusic.com

Herbie Mann albums
1967 live albums
albums produced by Nesuhi Ertegun
Atlantic Records live albums
Albums recorded at the Newport Jazz Festival